Lakas–Christian Muslim Democrats, abbreviated as Lakas–CMD and also known simply as Lakas, is a political party in the Philippines. Lakas–CMD is considered to sit on the centre-right of the political spectrum, and is influenced by Christian democracy and Islamic democracy. Since the 2022 elections, Lakas–CMD is currently the biggest party in the House of Representatives, with the party's president, Martin Romualdez, serving as Speaker of the House. Vice President Sara Duterte is the party's chairperson, and the party is a dominant member of the UniTeam Alliance led by President Bongbong Marcos.

Lakas–CMD has produced one President of the Philippines, Gloria Macapagal Arroyo, who was in power when the party was formed in 2009, and one vice president, Sara Duterte, who was elected in 2022.

Lakas–CMD was founded in 2008, after the original Lakas–CMD party merged with the Kabalikat ng Malayang Pilipino (KAMPI), forming Lakas Kampi CMD. The party later reverted to its original name and removed KAMPI after many of its members defected to the National Unity Party (NUP). 

After the 2010 elections, the party was split into both the majority and minority blocs. By 2013, Lakas supported most candidates of the opposition coalition United Nationalist Alliance in the 2013 Senate election, although the party was still split. After the 2016 elections, the party joined the majority bloc led by PDP–Laban, the party of the winner of the presidential election, Rodrigo Duterte. In the 2019 elections, the party joined the Hugpong ng Pagbabago alliance. After the 2022 elections, Lakas won the vice presidency and replaced PDP–Laban as the largest party in Congress, leading the majority bloc.

History

Origins 
After the Hello Garci scandal, the party was split into two main factions in 2006, one led by President Gloria Macapagal Arroyo and another by former president Fidel V. Ramos, who had initially supported Arroyo despite the scandal but later called for her resignation.

On January 16, 2008, Lakas spokesman and legal counsel Raul Lambino released a list of potential Lakas senatorial bets for 2010. Except for Parañaque Representative Eduardo Zialcita, they were not yet identified.

Former House Speaker Jose de Venecia Jr. resigned his post as president of Lakas–CMD on March 10, 2008; he rejected the proposition of former president Fidel Ramos to give him the title Chairman-emeritus. The then current House Speaker Prospero Nograles was sworn in as the new president of Lakas–CMD party and Feliciano Belmonte Jr. as vice president for Metro Manila affairs on the same day.

On June 18, 2008, President Arroyo confirmed the merger of the original Lakas–Christian Muslim Democrats (Lakas–CMD) and the Kabalikat ng Malayang Pilipino (KAMPI) parties. Both parties adopted the "equity of the incumbent" principle, as the merger would account for almost 200 national and 8,000 local officials, amid Arroyo's prediction of 2010 elections victory. The party's president, Prospero Nograles, and KAMPI chairperson, Ronaldo Puno, signed the covenant at the Davao City regional caucus. Ramos announced on February 6, 2008, that the Lakas–CMD name would be retained even after the merger, and asserted that de Venecia will remain as the party's president.

On August 9, 2009, de Venecia and Ramos led fifty members from Lakas in objecting to its merger with KAMPI on May 28, 2009. The faction retained de Venecia its president with Ramos as the Chairman Emeritus. Ramos refused the offer to become the Chairman Emeritus of the new party after being named in the interim party organization. De Venecia filed a resolution at the Commission on Elections to declare the merger null and void. However, the Supreme Court ultimately upheld the legality of the merger, citing the failure of de Venecia "to sufficiently show that any grave abuse of discretion was committed by the Commission on Elections in rendering the challenged resolution."

Majority to minority (2010–2016) 
In the 2010 elections, the party suffered several losses, and was split into both the majority and minority blocs. It lost the 2010 presidential election with Gilberto Teodoro as its presidential nominee while only two of its candidates in the 2010 Senate election won; the two joined the Liberal Party–led majority coalition. In the 2010 House of Representatives election, it won 47% of the seats contested in the district election. However, after Benigno Aquino III was sworn in as president on June 30, 2010, the majority of the former legislative members of Lakas were sworn as members of the reborn Liberal Party, Aquino's party. Other members led by Pablo P. Garcia established the neutral National Unity Party in December 2010. After the split, the party's new chairman, Edcel Lagman, declared that the Lakas Kampi CMD coalition has "ceased to exist". On May 11, 2012, the party decided to revert to its original name and drop Arroyo's KAMPI from the coalition. It became one of the parties in the opposition after the 2010 elections.

The party weakened following Arroyo's arrest under charges of electoral fraud in 2011 which were later dismissed, and again in 2012, on charges of misuse of $8.8 million in state lottery funds; she would later be acquitted in 2017. On February 5, 2013, senator Bong Revilla succeeded Lagman and became the party's chairperson, while 1st district representative of Leyte, Martin Romualdez, became the party's president. In the 2013 Senate election, the party mostly supported several candidates from the United Nationalist Alliance (UNA), which counts previous Lakas members among its candidates, such as Juan Miguel Zubiri, Dick Gordon, and Mitos Magsaysay. Three out of nine UNA candidates were elected.

In 2016, the party initially planned to field senator Revilla for the presidential election. However, he would be detained at the Philippine National Police custodial center at Camp Crame due to his alleged involvement in the pork barrel scam. By August 2015, Lakas reportedly eyed to form an alliance with UNA and support vice president Jejomar Binay's candidacy for president. However, by February 2016, the party failed to reach a consensus on who to support, eventually opting not to endorse any candidate for president. The party supported the candidacy of Bongbong Marcos for vice president, who lost.

Recovery under the Duterte administration (2016–2022) 
After then Davao City mayor Rodrigo Duterte won the presidential election, Lakas signed a coalition agreement with Duterte's party, PDP–Laban, on May 18, 2016, joining several other political parties in the Coalition for Change, the administration's coalition. In October 2017, Arroyo and two of her allies joined PDP–Laban. According to Arroyo, the move was done to "consolidate support for the president." In September 2018, House Minority Leader Danilo Suarez, who had rejoined Lakas, announced that the party is rebuilding to restore its dominance before Arroyo stepped down as president. On November 6, 2018, the party joined Hugpong ng Pagbabago, with Revilla joining the coalition's senatorial slate for the 2019 Senate election. Revilla was reelected, marking Lakas' return to the upper chamber. The party also won a dozen seats in the 2019 House of Representatives elections. After the 2019 elections, several politicians joined the party. Arroyo returned to the party on March 9, 2020.

On November 17, 2021, Sara Duterte became the chairperson of the party, succeeding Revilla. Following her move to Lakas, she announced her candidacy for vice president in the 2022 vice presidential election, becoming the running mate of Bongbong Marcos. On November 29, 2021, the party formed the UniTeam Alliance with three other parties to support the candidacies of Marcos and Duterte. The tandem won the elections, becoming the first presidential ticket to win together since Arroyo's victory along with her running mate in 2004.

Return to dominance (2022–present) 
Following the 2022 Philippine general election, which saw Lakas winning 26 seats in the House of Representatives as well as the vice presidency, 38 politicians moved to the party, most of whom belonged to the weakening PDP–Laban. By the time the 19th Congress was opened, the party's seats in the House of Representatives increased from 12 in the 18th Congress to 64, replacing PDP–Laban as the dominant party in the lower house. Prominent members of the party were elected to various leadership positions in the lower house; Romualdez was elected as the House Speaker while Arroyo and Isidro Ungab became deputy speakers.

Ideology
Lakas–CMD adheres to the Christian democracy and Islamic democracy ideologies, adopting the same ideologies of its predecessor party, and is a member of the Centrist Democrats International (CDI). The party also advocates for a shift from the present presidential system to a parliamentary form of government through constitutional amendments and through establishing peace talks with Muslim separatists and communist rebels.

Lakas–CMD has always focused on economic growth and development, stronger ties with the United States, creation of jobs, and strong cooperation between the executive and legislative branches of government. The party is distinct in its ecumenical inclusion of Muslim leaders in its political alliance. The party has tended to be more popular in the Mindanao provinces.

Current party officials 

 President Emerita: Gloria Macapagal Arroyo
 National President: Martin Romualdez
 Chairperson: Sara Duterte
 Co-Chairpersons:
 Bong Revilla
 Danilo Suarez
 Jose de Venecia Jr.
 Secretary-General: Prospero Pichay Jr.

List of party chairpersons 
 Gloria Macapagal Arroyo (2008–2009)
 Gilberto Teodoro (2009–2010)
 Amelita Villarosa (2010)
 Gloria Macapagal Arroyo (2010–2011)
 Edcel Lagman (2011–2012)
 Bong Revilla, Jr. (2012–2021)
 Sara Duterte (2021–present)

Candidates for Philippine general elections

2010

Presidential ticket 

 Gilbert Teodoro for president – lost
 Edu Manzano for vice president – lost

For senator 

 Silvestre Bello III – lost
 Ramon Guico Jr. – lost
 Prospero Pichar Jr. - lost
 Raul Lambino – lost
 Rey Langit – lost
 Lito Lapid – won
 Bong Revilla – won

2016

For senator 

 Greco Belgica (candidate for Rodrigo Duterte/PDP–Laban and Miriam-Bongbong party) – lost
 Romeo Maganto – lost
 Edu Manzano (candidate for Partido Galing at Puso and Miriam-Bongbong party) – lost
 Martin Romualdez (candidate for United Nationalist Alliance and Miriam-Bongbong party) – lost

2019

For senator 

 Bong Revilla (also running under Hugpong ng Pagbabago) – won
 Willie Ong – lost
 Larry Gadon (guest candidate from Kilusang Bagong Lipunan and Katipunan ng Demokratikong Pilipino) – lost

2022

Presidential ticket 

 Bongbong Marcos for president (adopted candidate from the Partido Federal ng Pilipinas) – won
 Sara Duterte for vice president – won

Electoral performance

Presidential elections

Vice presidential elections

Legislative elections

Senate

House of Representatives

Current members, 18th Congress

House of Representatives

District Representatives 

 Majority leader Martin Romualdez (Leyte, D1)
 Deputy Speaker Prospero Pichay, Jr. (Surigao del Sur, D2)
 Juan Miguel Arroyo (Pampanga, D2)
 Christopher de Venecia (Pangasinan, D4)
 Ramon Guico III (Pangasinan, D5)
 Aleta Suarez (Quezon, D3)
 Vincent Frasco (Cebu, D5)
 Paz Radaza (Lapu lapu City, LD)
 Marilou Arroyo (Negros Occidental, D5)

 Christian Unabia (Misamis Oriental D1)
 Fredenil Castro (Capiz, D2)
 J.F. Felipe Nograles (Rizal, D4-Montalban)
 Hector Sanchez (Catanduanes LD)
 Roger Mercado (Southern Leyte, D2)
 Gerardo Espina, Jr. (Biliran LD)
 Geraldine Roman (Bataan, D1)
 Leonardo Babasa, Jr. (Zamboanga del Sur D2)
 Wilter Palma II (Zamboanga Sibugay D2)

Allied Partylist Representatives 

 Rodante Marcoleta (Sagip)
 Yedda Romualdez (Tingog Sinirangan)
 Mike Defensor (AnaKalusugan)
 Sonny Lagon (Ako Bisaya)
 Alfredo Garbin (Ako Bicol)
 Elizalde Co (Ako Bicol)
 Ana Marie Villaraza-Suarez (Alona)
 Adriano Ebcas (Ako Padayon Pilipino)
 Romeo Momo (CWS)
 Jose Gay Padiernos (Galing sa Puso [GP])
 Presley de Jesus (PHILRECA)
 Sergio Dagooc (APEC)
 Alfred delos Santos (Ang Probinsyano)
 Jose Teves, Jr. (TGP)

Notes

References

External links

 

2008 establishments in the Philippines
Centrist parties in the Philippines
Christian democratic parties in Asia
Conservative parties in the Philippines
Federalist parties
Islamic democratic political parties
Political parties established in 2008